The Tirana International Film Festival (TIFF) is one of the major annual events taking place in Tirana each year. It was the first international cinema festival in Albania. This cultural event was created in 2003 and is currently the most important cinematic event in Albania.

The Festival is competitive with the International Section jury awarding several prizes each year, most notably the "Golden Owl" for Best Feature Film.

It is organised annually by the Albanian National Center of Cinematography. It features three distinct categories and combines features and short film; fiction, documentary, animation and experimental. The festival is open to any filmmaker from around the world and it also accepts student works.

History
The festival was held for the first time in 2003. Since then it has been held annually in the cinemas of Tirana.
During the 12th edition more than 5,400 applications were submitted.

In 2015, the Festival introduced DocuTIFF (Documentary Tirana International Film Festival), after large applications sent during the 12th edition of the Festival held in 2014. It was impossible to show all these production in one single festival and new festivals were created for each category such as DocuTIFF, for documentary film, AnimaTIFF, for animated  productions and ExpoTIFF for experimental films.

Award Winners
The list of the Winners of the "Golden Owl'' award for each year is as follows:

See also 
International Film Summerfest of Durrës

References

Film festivals in Albania
Recurring events established in 2003
Events in Tirana
Tourist attractions in Tirana
2003 establishments in Albania